Dashitou is a town in Dunhua, Yanbian, Jilin. The town has an area of  total population of 61,173 people, and the total number of households is 17,264.

Administrative divisions 
Dashitou contains 8 residential communities and 20 administrative villages.

Residential communities 
The town's 8 residential communities are as follows:

 Jinrong Community
 Shangye Community
 Xinghuo Community
 Xilin Community
 Tiebei Community
 Donglin Community
 Nanlin Community
 Zhongxin Community

Administrative villages 
The town's 20 administrative villages are as follows:

 Taipingchuan Village
 Dayushuchuan Village
 Dongsheng Village
 Minsheng village
 Xinlitun Village
 Hongxing Village
 Erdaohezi Village
 Sandaohezi Village
 Ha'erbaling Village
 Huizu Village
 Zengyi Village
 Changsheng Village
 Yongle Village
 Hebei Village
 Dongchang Village
 Changqing Village
 Yongqing Village
 Mingxing Village
 Sandaoliangzi Village
 Minqiangcun Village

Demographics 
Dashitou is home to populations of Han Chinese, Korean, Manchu, Hui, and Mongol ethnicities.

Transportation 
National Highway 302 runs through the town.

The  runs through Dashitou. The town is served by the Dashitou South railway station, which opened on April 10, 2018.

References 

Township-level divisions of Jilin
Dunhua